Oliver Semmle (born 28 March 1998) is a German footballer who currently plays as a goalkeeper for Louisville City in the USL Championship.

Career

Youth and college
Semmle played as part of the Karlsruher SC academy from 2012, appearing for the club's second team in the Oberliga Baden-Württemberg and making a single senior appearance in the Baden Cup in 2018. 

In 2018, Semmle moved to the United States to play college soccer at Barton Community College where he made seven appearances for the Cougars. In 2019, he transferred to Monroe College, making 12 appearances and only conceding two goals during the entire season with the Mustangs, helping lead Monroe to its first ever NJCAA Division I Men's Soccer Championship. Semmle again transferred colleges in 2020, joining Marshall University. In his junior season, Semmle  played all but 45-minutes of the Thundering Herd's national title campaign, leading the NCAA with eleven shutouts while holding a 0.380 goals against average. In his three seasons at Marshall, Semmle was named Conference USA Goalkeeper of the Year, the Conference USA Golden Glove Award, First-Team All-Conference USA, 2021 United Soccer Coaches All-Southeast Region Third Team and 2021 Second Team All-Conference USA.

Professional
On 21 December 2022, Semmle was selected 41st overall in the 2023 MLS SuperDraft by Colorado Rapids. However, he went unsigned by the club.

On 15 February 2023, Semmle signed with USL Championship side Louisville City ahead of their upcoming season. He made his debut for Louisville on 18 March 2023, starting in a 1–0 against Monterey Bay.

References

External links 
 Oliver Semmle LouCity bio

1998 births
Living people
Association football goalkeepers
Barton Cougars men's soccer players
Colorado Rapids draft picks
Expatriate soccer players in the United States
German expatriate footballers
German expatriate sportspeople in the United States
German footballers
Karlsruher SC players
Louisville City FC players
Marshall Thundering Herd men's soccer players
Monroe Mustangs men's soccer players
USL Championship players